Karine Gautard-Roussel (born 25 July 1984) is a road cyclist from France. She represented her nation at the 2008 and 2009 UCI Road World Championships.

Teams  
2006-2009

Vienna Futuroscope (UCI) 

2005

Team Pruneaux d'Agen (UCI)

References

External links
 profile at Cycling Archives.com

1984 births
French female cyclists
Living people
Place of birth missing (living people)
Cyclists from Normandy
Sportspeople from Caen